In demonology, Ronove is a Marquis and Great Earl of Hell, commanding twenty legions of demons. He teaches art, rhetoric, languages, and gives good and loyal servants the favour of friends and foes.

He is depicted as a monster holding a staff, without detailing his appearance. He is also described as taker of old souls; often coming to earth to harvest souls of decrepit humans and animals near death.

It is also spelled Ronové and Ronwe.

See also

The Lesser Key of Solomon

Sources
S. L. MacGregor Mathers, A. Crowley, The Goetia: The Lesser Key of Solomon the King (1904). 1995 reprint: .

Goetic demons